The first USS Hampton (ID-3049), also listed as SP-3049, was a United States Navy tug in commission from 1918 to 1919.

Hampton was built as the  commercial tug Mary Lee in 1905 by H. Turman at Turkey Point, Virginia.  She later was renamed Hampton.

In 1918, the U.S. Navy chartered Hampton from her owner for use during World War I. She may initially have been assigned the section patrol number SP-3049, although she eventually was identified by the naval registry identification number ID-3049. She was commissioned as either USS Hampton (SP-3049) or USS Hampton (ID-3049) on 21 April 1918.

Assigned to the 5th Naval District at Norfolk, Virginia, Hampton served on general harbor duty in Hampton Roads for the rest of World War I and into 1919.

Hampton was returned to her owner on 13 August 1919.

Notes

References

ID-3049 Hampton at Department of the Navy Naval History and Heritage Command Online Library of Selected Images: U.S. Navy Ships -- Listed by Hull Number: "SP" #s and "ID" #s -- World War I Era Patrol Vessels and other Acquired Ships and Craft numbered from ID # 3000 through SP-3099
NavSource Online: Section Patrol Craft Photo Archive: Hampton (ID 3049)

Auxiliary ships of the United States Navy
World War I auxiliary ships of the United States
Tugs of the United States Navy
Ships built in Norfolk, Virginia
1905 ships